Peccati di gioventù, internationally released as So Young, So Lovely, So Vicious..., is a 1975 Italian psychological drama/coming-of-age film directed by Silvio Amadio. The film stars Gloria Guida and Dagmar Lassander.

Plot   
Angela is not satisfied with her father's choice for new wife Irene. Angela pretends to be nice with Irene, but privately does everything she can to damage her stepmother-to-be, starting by forcing her boyfriend (Sandro) on her, then when she realizes she is hiding a scandal from her past, schemes to start a lesbian relationship with her in which Sandro will take pictures to blackmail her.

Cast 
 Gloria Guida as Angela Batrucchi 
 Dagmar Lassander as  Irene
 Silvano Tranquilli as  Dr. Batrucchi  
 Fred Robsahm as  Sandro Romagnoli
 Dana Ghia

See also    
 List of Italian films of 1975

References

External links

1970s coming-of-age comedy-drama films
1975 films
Films directed by Silvio Amadio
Italian coming-of-age comedy-drama films
Italian erotic drama films
LGBT-related coming-of-age films
Films set in Sardinia
1970s erotic drama films
1975 comedy films
1975 drama films
Films scored by Roberto Pregadio

1975 LGBT-related films
1970s Italian-language films
1970s Italian films